11:55 is a 2016 drama film about a US Marine returning to his hometown, where he struggles to escape his violent past. The film was written by Ari Issler, Ben Snyder, and Victor Almanzar. It was directed by Issler and Snyder, and stars Almanzar, Shirley Rumierk, Goya Robles, Elizabeth Rodriguez, David Zayas, Mike Carlsen, John Leguizamo, and Julia Stiles. The film's plot and sensibility contain echoes to the classic Westerns High Noon (1952) and 3:10 to Yuma (1957).

11:55 premiered at the Los Angeles International Film Festival. It has since played at the Seattle Film Festival, Woodstock Film Festival, Austin Film Festival, Napa Film Festival, Milwaukee Film Festival, and Woods Hole Film Festival. The film won the Audience Award at the Aspen Film Festival and the RiverRun Film Festival.

11:55 was released in theaters by Gravitas Ventures and made on demand June 9, 2017.

Cast
 Victor Almanzar as Nelson Sanchez
 Shirley Rumierk as Livvy
 Elizabeth Rodriguez as Angie
 Robin de Jesús as Rubio
 Mike Carlsen as Nicky Quinn
 Goya Robles as Teyo
 Dominic Colón as Cezar
 John Leguizamo as Berto
 Smarlin Hernandez as Daiza
 Kareem Savinon as Kade
 Johnny Rivera as Fresh

References

External links
 
 

2016 drama films
2016 films
American drama films
2010s English-language films
2010s American films